Alex Mario Ambrose (born 8 September 1982) is a former Indian professional football player and manager.

Controversy
He was charged with sexual misconduct with a minor player during Indian women under-17 team's exposure trip to Norway. He was sacked from the assistant coach position and was called back to face investigation.

Honours

India U23
 LG Cup: 2002

References

External links
goal.com

Indian footballers
1982 births
Living people
Mumbai FC players
India youth international footballers
Footballers at the 2002 Asian Games
Association football forwards
Asian Games competitors for India